Ivo Prokopiev (born July 10, 1971) is a Bulgarian entrepreneur, publisher and opinion leader with strong public commitment.  He is the founder and co-owner of three Bulgarian groups of companies – A Data Pro, Alfa Finance Holding and Economedia Publishing Group. He holds a master's degree in Finance from the University of National and World Economy in Sofia and an Executive MBA from INSEAD.

Public commitments 
During the years of transition to a free market economy in Bulgaria, Ivo Prokopiev has been involved in a number of key reforms and projects in both the public and private sectors. He took part in the currency board introduction and banking sector restructuring, pension reform strategy, media self-regulation and many others.

Between 2006 and 2010 Ivo Prokopiev was elected as the first Chairman of KRIB (the Confederation of employers and industrialists in Bulgaria), the biggest business association in the country.

Ivo Prokopiev was the Honorary Consul of Canada in Bulgaria for three mandates from 2010 to 2019.

Business 
Ivo Prokopiev is the chairman of the board of directors and CEO of Alfa Finance Holding. Alfa Finance Holding is a leading Bulgarian industrial and financial group with four main business lines: industrial minerals, financial services, real estate and clean energy. The Holding also invests successfully in logistics, construction, and telecommunications sectors. The Group comprises more than 30 companies and is actively involved in projects in Bulgaria, and other seven countries in East and South East Europe (Albania, Greece, North Macedonia, Romania, Serbia, Turkey, and Ukraine). The Holding structure manages assets exceeding EUR 1.5 billion.

Ivo Prokopiev is also chairman of the board of directors of Economedia publishing House, the second largest in the country and a leader in the premium press segment. The media group was founded in 1993 by Philip Harmandjiev and himself and today it owns more than 25 editions, among them print publications, licensed magazines, business-to-business publications and internet products, the daily paper Dnevnik (Bulgarian newspaper) and the business analysis media Kapital.

Media freedom 
Prokopiev's Kapital and Dnevnik (Bulgarian newspaper) have been vital in the preservation of media freedom in Bulgaria.  As an owner of a source of independent media, Prokopiev has become a target of the ones critiqued in his journalists' reports of corruption in the Bulgarian government.

Media mogul Delyan Peevski, member of the Movement for Rights and Freedoms, is often associated with Bulgaria's decline in freedom of press. Peevski and his fellow party-men have been accused of the smear campaigns against Prokopiev with the intention of diminishing the influence of his independent media. In 2022, Prokopiev announced he will initiate another lawsuit against four members of the political party for defamation committed against him.  Prokopiev has sued Nikolay Barekov, journalist closely affiliated with the political party, for slander four times.

In 2020, Prokopiev was ruled innocent by the Bulgarian court for the privatisation of the energetics firm EVN, after he was accused of inflicting damages to the state budget based on a statement he made in an  interview. Judge Velislava Angelova ruled all of the accused in the trial innocent and argued the legitimacy of the trial due to "lack of legal grounds." Prokopiev has often raised concerns that the Bulgarian Prosecution has become an instrument of corrupt individuals to "shut the mouthes of independent media in Bulgaria."

Prior to the EVN trial, the director of Reporters Without Borders Christophe Deloire stated he is "concerned about the legal proceedings in a court case against Bulgarian publisher Ivo Prokopiev, owner of the most significant sources of independent and high quality journalism in Bulgaria. on Twitter. American diplomat, Madeleine Albright, also expressed concerns by re-tweeting OSCE Representative on Freedom of the Media's "close following of the criminal procedures against media owner Ivo Prokopiev. 

In response to former Prime Minister Boyko Borisov's claims that "Prokopiev is the same as Delyan Peevski," Prokopiev argued that such allegations are false and representative of Bulgaria's many deep state features. Furthermore, he shared his views that the Prime Minister has been a part of Bulgaria's problems, not the solutions to them.

References 

Bulgarian State Freezes Assets of Critical Publisher
Bulgaria harasses independent media group again
Ivo Prokopiev to sue four MRF MPs for defamation (updated at 12.03) – Bulgaria
Bulgarian court acquits independent newspaper publisher charged with ‘voicing opinions’
Influential Entrepreneur Ivo Prokopiev is Suing Bulgaria in the European Court of Human Rights 
Specialised Court rules defendants innocent in trial for EVN privatisation
Reporters Without Borders - Bulgaria 
Board of ENPA  European Newspaper Publishers Association

TRANSFUSE members
Alfa Finance Holding management   [www.alfafinance.bg]
Economedia history

External links 
 

Bulgarian businesspeople
Living people
1971 births
People from Razgrad
University of National and World Economy alumni